Myles Iain Christian Bright (born 18 October 2002) is an English professional footballer who plays for Huddersfield Town as a midfielder. On 14 March 2023, he joined Hemel Hempstead Town on loan until the end of the 2022–23 season.

Career
Born in London, Bright started his football career at Lambeth Tigers, before moving to Huddersfield Town in 2019, alongside goalkeeper Giosue Bellagambi.

Bright made his senior debut for Huddersfield Town on 9 January 2021, when he made a substitute appearance in their 3–2 FA Cup defeat against Plymouth Argyle.

On 14 March 2023, Bright joined National League South side Hemel Hempstead Town on loan until the end of the 2022–23 season.

References

2002 births
Living people
Huddersfield Town A.F.C. players
Association football midfielders
English footballers
English Football League players